Epidichostates is a genus of longhorn beetles of the subfamily Lamiinae.

 Epidichostates molossus (Duvivier, 1892)
 Epidichostates strandi (Breuning, 1935)

References

Crossotini